Hester Street is a 1975 romantic film based on Abraham Cahan's 1896 novella Yekl: A Tale of the New York Ghetto, and was adapted and directed by Joan Micklin Silver. In 2011, Hester Street was added to the National Film Registry of the Library of Congress.

The film stars Steven Keats and Carol Kane, who was nominated for an Academy Award for Best Actress for the role of Gitl.

Plot
Hester Street tells the story of Jewish immigrants who come to the Lower East Side of New York City in 1896 from Eastern Europe, and who live on Hester Street in Manhattan. When Yankel first comes to the U.S., he quickly assimilates into American culture, and becomes Jake. He also begins to have an affair with Mamie, a dancer. His wife, Gitl, who arrives later with their son, Yossele, has difficulty assimilating. Tension arises in their marriage as Jake continually upbraids and abuses Gitl. Additionally, Jake continues to see Mamie, which Gitl later discovers through Mrs. Kavarsky, a neighbor. Jake and Gitl ultimately divorce, whereby Gitl takes all of Mamie's money and marries Bernstein, a faithful traditionalist. By the end of the film, she is sartorially and lingually assimilated — walking down the street with Bernstein and Yossele (now known as Joey), speaking English, and showing her hair. But she is now liberated from Jake, who in turn has married Mamie.

The film is noteworthy for its detailed reconstruction of Jewish immigrant life in New York at the turn of the century – much of the dialogue is delivered in Yiddish with English subtitles – and was part of the wave of films released in the late 1960s and through the 1970s which began explicitly to deal with the complexities of American Jewish identity. In addition, Carol Kane's lead character posed a still-provocative synthesis as she discovers her own self-assertion on behalf of her right to maintain a traditional identity in an aggressively modern setting.

Cast
Steven Keats as Jake
Carol Kane as Gitl
Mel Howard as Bernstein
Dorrie Kavanaugh as  Mamie
Doris Roberts as Mrs. Kavarsky
Lauren Friedman as Fanny

Reception
Variety was positive, stating that Hester Street "deftly delves into Jewish emigration" and that Silver "displays a sure hand for her first pic". Turned down by multiple Hollywood studios for being "too ethnic," Hester Street went on to earn $5 million at the box office against a budget of only $370,000.

On Rotten Tomatoes, the film holds a rating of 82% from 28 reviews.

Awards and nominations

In 2011, this film was deemed "culturally, historically, or aesthetically significant" by the United States Library of Congress, and selected for the National Film Registry. In making its selection, the Registry state that Hester Street was "a portrait of Eastern European Jewish life in America that historians have praised for its accuracy of detail and sensitivity to the challenges immigrants faced during their acculturation process".

References

External links
Hester Street essay by Eric A. Goldman on the National Film Registry website 
Hester Street on Turner Classic Movies 

1975 films
1975 directorial debut films
1975 drama films
American black-and-white films
Films about Jews and Judaism
Films based on American novels
Films directed by Joan Micklin Silver
Films set in New York City
Films set in the 1890s
United States National Film Registry films
Yiddish-language films
1970s English-language films